The Golden Ball is awarded in the Czech Republic by a poll of Czech sport journalists from the Club of Sport Journalists (Klub sportovních novinářů, KSN). Eligible are Czech players in the Czech Republic and abroad. Awards for young player and coach of the year are also awarded. The award for the Coach of the Year, is named after Rudolf Vytlačil, successful Czechoslovak coach. Petr Čech won his eighth Zlatý míč in nine years in 2013.

The other football award in the Czech Republic is the Czech Footballer of the Year awarded by the Football Association of the Czech Republic (FAČR).

Winners

References 
  Vítězem ankety Zlatý míč ČR se stal popáté Petr Čech at Eurofotbal.cz

Football in the Czech Republic
Czech Z
Awards established in 1997
Czech sports trophies and awards
1997 establishments in the Czech Republic
Annual events in the Czech Republic